The Tuxtla Statuette is a small 6.3 inch (16 cm) rounded greenstone figurine, carved to resemble a squat, bullet-shaped human with a duck-like bill and wings.  Most researchers believe the statuette represents a shaman wearing a bird mask and bird cloak.  It is incised with 75 glyphs of the Epi-Olmec or Isthmian script, one of the few extant examples of this very early Mesoamerican writing system.

The human face carved into the stone is unremarkable except for the long bill that extends down to chest level.  This bill has been identified as belonging to the boat-billed heron, a locally abundant bird along the Tabasco and southern Veracruz Gulf Coast.  Raised wings or a wing-like cape envelop the body while feet have been incised into the base.

The Tuxtla Statuette is particularly notable in that its glyphs include the Mesoamerican Long Count calendar date of March 162 CE, which in 1902 was the oldest Long Count date discovered.  A product of the final century of the Epi-Olmec culture, the statuette is from the same region and period as La Mojarra Stela 1 and may refer to the same events or persons.  Similarities between the Tuxtla Statuette and Cerro de las Mesas Monument 5, a boulder carved to represent a semi-nude figure with a duckbill-like buccal mask, have also been noted.

The Tuxtla Statuette was discovered in 1902 by a farmer plowing his field in the west foothills of the Tuxtlas mountains in the Mexican state of Veracruz.  It was acquired by the Smithsonian Institution shortly thereafter, reputedly smuggled into New York hidden in a shipment of tobacco leaf.  At the time, several Mayanists including Sylvanus Morley, could not believe that the statuette pre-dated the Maya and suggested that the date and text were inscribed much later than 162 CE.  However, later discoveries, such as La Mojarra Stela 1 and Tres Zapotes Stela C, confirmed the antiquity of the statuette.

The Tuxtla Statuette is in the collections of the Department of Anthropology, National Museum of Natural History, Smithsonian Institution, Washington, D.C. It is currently on display in the National Museum of Natural History exhibit "Objects of Wonder".

Notes

References
 
 
  (2001) Epi-Olmec Hieroglyphic Writing and Texts, Austin, Texas.

External links

Photo of boat-billed heron looking quite similar to the Tuxtla Statuette
Tuxtla statuette online record in artifact catalogue database of Department of Anthropology, Smithsonian Institution National Museum of Natural History

Epi-Olmec culture
Inscriptions in undeciphered writing systems
Los Tuxtlas
Mesoamerican artifacts
Mesoamerican inscriptions